Sybra elongatissima is a species of beetle in the family Cerambycidae. It was described by Breuning in 1939. It is known from Borneo and Malaysia.

References

elongatissima
Beetles described in 1939